Tirunedunkulam  is a village in Tiruchirappalli taluk of Tiruchirappalli district in Tamil Nadu, India.

Demographics 

As per the 2001 census, Tirunedunkulam had a population of 1,464 with 732 males and 732 females. The sex ratio was 1000 and the literacy rate, 82.02.

References 

 

Villages in Tiruchirappalli district